I Have Hands is the sixth studio album by the American indie pop duo the Bran Flakes. It was released on 24 February 2009 on the Illegal Art label. Various music videos for the tracks were released on The Bran Flakes' official YouTube channel from January 2009 to June 2009.

Track listing

Personnel 
The Bran Flakes
 Otis Fodder
 Mildred Pitt

References

External links
 Myspace page
 

2009 albums
Illegal Art albums
Indie pop albums by American artists